"Oasis" is a single released by Gackt on February 16, 2000 under Nippon Crown. It peaked at seventh place on the Oricon weekly chart and charted for six weeks. It is Gackt's seventh best selling single, with 126,280 copies sold. The song "Oasis" was used as the ending theme for the New Fist of the North Star OVA in 2003, and released along "Lu:na" as a single "Lu:na/Oasis" the same year.

Track listing

References

2000 singles
Gackt songs
Songs written by Gackt
2000 songs